"Yours Is No Disgrace" is a song by English progressive rock band Yes, which first appeared as the opening song of their 1971 album The Yes Album. It was written by all five members of the band: Jon Anderson, Chris Squire, Steve Howe, Tony Kaye and Bill Bruford. The song was also released as a single in some continental European countries such as Italy and the Netherlands.  In Italy the song was divided between the A-side and B-side.  In the Netherlands it was released as a maxi single, backed with "Your Move" and "Sweet Dreams". The song has been a regular feature of Yes' live shows.  It has also appeared on many live and compilation albums, including Yessongs, Classic Yes and Yesstory.

The opening track off The Yes Album, "Yours Is No Disgrace" clocks in at nearly ten minutes. According to Allmusic critic Dave Thompson, the length and complexity of "Yours Is No Disgrace" was tester for Yes' lengthy songs over their next few albums, most notably "And You and I," although he states that "at the time of release, however, it was unique – and, listened to in isolation today, it remains so."

Lyrics
According to Edward Macan, "Yours Is No Disgrace" "is generally recognized as Yes' first antiwar song" (though "Harold Land" from their debut album deals with the subject of war).  Anderson has stated that the theme of the song was recognition that the kids fighting the war had no choice but to fight and that the war wasn't their fault. Author Bill Martin describes "Yours Is No Disgrace" as "a remarkable and subtle song about the Vietnam War." The lyrics make their point by contrasting the suffering of the soldiers in Vietnam with people partying in Las Vegas. The author Dave Thompson praises the line "On a sailing ship to nowhere" as "[conjuring] a mental image that the music cannot help but echo."

The original words "armies gather near" (confirmed in every recorded live version) have been misprinted as "armies scatter the earth" numerous times, suggesting this may have been a mis-transcription in the first published version, as the album cover itself did not include lyrics.

Composition
The song begins with a staccato introduction, which builds tension right away. The introduction's main riff was contributed by Jon Anderson, and was the subject of an argument in the band since some of the other members thought it was overly derivative of the theme music for the TV series Bonanza. This is followed by Howe's guitar riffs, which have been described by various critics as both joyous and menacing.  Howe built up the guitar parts using overdubs, which was a new experience to him.  Howe stated that 
he created "a 'studioized' solo because it was made up in different sections. I became three guitarists."  Ultimate Classic Rock critic Ryan Reed describes Howe's playing as "a masterwork of staccato crunch, frenetic lead twang and jazz-rock sizzle." Author Dave Simonelli remarks that the "jagged but simple related pattern of chords" that Howe plays are developed in a manner analogous to a symphony.  Village Voice critic Robert Christgau also praises Howe's playing on the song.

Howe has stated that his guitar solo on the song is one of his favorites because it was the first time he was able to overdub his parts in that manner. Tony Kaye was against the idea of using any kind of synthesizers out of studio, so during live gigs band didn't used Moog, and Jon Anderson was forced to handle Kaye's parts on the Dewtron "Mister Bassman" bass pedal synthesizer. According to Yes biographer Chris Welch, the vocals by Anderson and Squire "exude a sense of optimism as if all past battles are finally over and nothing can now stop the band's musical odyssey."

Personnel
Band
Jon Andersonlead vocals, percussion
Chris Squirebass guitar, backing vocals
Steve Howeelectric & acoustic guitars, backing vocals
Tony KayeHammond organ, Moog
Bill Bruforddrums, percussion

See also
 List of anti-war songs

References

Bibliography
Dimery, Robert 1001 Albums You Must Hear Before You Die New York: Quintet Publishing Limited, 2005. 
Covach, John Rudolph and Boone, Graeme MacDonald Understanding Rock: Essays in Musical Analysis New York: Oxford University Press, 1997. 

Yes (band) songs
1971 songs
Song recordings produced by Eddy Offord
Songs written by Jon Anderson
Songs written by Chris Squire
Songs written by Steve Howe (musician)
Songs written by Bill Bruford
Protest songs
Anti-war songs
Songs of the Vietnam War
Atlantic Records singles